”What's Expected of Us” is a science fiction short story by American writer Ted Chiang, initially published on 6 July 2005 by Nature. The story was also included in the 2006 anthology Year's Best SF 11 and in the 2019 collection Exhalation: Stories.

Plot summary
A small device, the Predictor, looks like a remote control. It consists of a button and a green display. When you press the button, the screen flashes. However, it flashes a second before you click on the button—in fact sending a signal from the future. Millions of these devices have been sold. The Predictors create a dystopic world by providing evidence that free will is actually a myth—the future is predetermined and fixed. As a result, people become lethargic and just stop eating entirely.

See also
 Free will and determinism
 Free will theorem
 Locus of control
 Problem of mental causation

References

External links 
 
 Expected of Us audiobook in the Internet Archive

Science fiction short stories
2005 short stories
Short stories by Ted Chiang